Kulvadhu is a 1937 Indian Hindi-language social family drama film directed by Sarvottam Badami. Made under the Sagar Movietone banner it had music by Pransukh M Nayak, and the  film starred Motilal, Sabita Devi, Gulzar and Pesi Patel.

As a publicity gimmick, Badami asked for reviews written in Marathi, English, Hindi and Gujarati languages, offering cash prizes of Rs.250, Rs. 150 and Rs. 100 for the best review. The ploy worked sending audiences to the theatre to see the film. Motilal's romantic role in the film was appreciated by the audiences.

Cast
 Motilal
 Sabita Devi
 Gulzar
 Pesi Patel
 Pande
 Jamu Patel

Music
The music was by Pransukh Nayak, with lyrics by Siddiqui.

Song List

References

External links

1937 films
1930s Hindi-language films
Indian drama films
1937 drama films
Indian black-and-white films
Hindi-language drama films